General elections were held in Jamaica on 29 December 2011. The elections were contested mainly between the nation's two major political parties, the governing Jamaica Labour Party (JLP), led by Andrew Holness, and the Portia Simpson-Miller-led opposition People's National Party (PNP). The result was a landslide victory for the PNP which won 42 of the 63 seats, a two-thirds majority.

Background
Since the previous elections in 2007, the number of seats had been increased from 60 (an even number) to 63 (an odd number). The close results of the 2007 general election spurred the change as the Electoral Commission concluded that a tie would not be resolved.

Opinion polls
Opinion polls indicated a slim lead for the opposition PNP six days before the election. The win by the PNP shocked even its leaders, such as Peter Phillips who said that "the results certainly exceeded our most optimistic scenarios".
Reports from the Electoral Office of Jamaica indicated that only just over 50 per cent of the entire voting population voted on Election Day, meaning that it was possible for the lower-than-usual voter turnout to have thrown off opinion polls' predictions for the result.

Results
The People's National Party (PNP) secured 42 seats out of 63 in a result described as a landslide victory. No minor parties won seats in the new Parliament. As a result, the PNP ended four years of rule for the Labour Party, which won 21 seats. Several Labour Party cabinet ministers lost their seats, including National Security Minister Dwight Nelson and Energy Minister Clive Mullings.

As a result, Portia Simpson-Miller assumed the role of Prime Minister for the second time in 5 years and Andrew Holness became one of the shortest-serving Prime Ministers in the history of Jamaica.

Polling was reported to have proceeded fairly smoothly, despite glitches with fingerprint scanners at some polling stations, and without the violence that has marred previous elections. The Organization of American States sent an observation mission to oversee the elections and they reported that they had not witnessed "any disturbances or any issues that would cause us any serious concern".

References

Elections in Jamaica
Jamaica
General election
December 2011 events in North America